The Ceylon Medal was a campaign medal awarded by the Government of Ceylon from 1819 for a military action along the Badulla-Passara route on 16 June 1818, during the closing stages of the Uva rebellion, part of the third Kandyan War. The medal was the only one struck for the Kandyan Wars.

Background
On 16 June 1818, several regiments of British colonial forces were on the road to Badulla: the 19th, 73rd,  the 1st and 2nd Ceylon Regiments, and the 7th, 15th and 18th Madras Native Infantry. The column took rest at Passara, and a Lieutenant Wilkinson directed a party of troops to go on ahead to Badulla and rendezvous with an escort party; this scouting party consisted of "6 Europeans, 6 Malays and 6 Caffres".

The General Orders of 7 July 1818 and 3 June 1819 notes the party of ten holding off the attackers for nearly two hours, until relief arrived in the form of a detachment from the 83rd regiment from Badulla. It goes on to promote McLaughlan to the rank of Sergeant, and recommend that the men involved be given some sort of formal distinction or recognition for their actions.

The Ceylonese Government struck the medal in 1819, with the total number awarded varying between sources, some stating 45 and others 47 (2 in gold, 45 in silver). By regiment, recipients included 39 men of the 1st and two of the 2nd Ceylon Regiment, together with four men of the 73rd Regiment. Four men were awarded the medals posthumously, having died of fever in the interim: Lance Corporal Richard McLaughlan, Private John Wilson, Private Christopher Sheppard and Private William Connor, all of the 73rd.

Design
The medal was intended to be worn around the neck on a 1.5 inch wide deep navy blue ribbon.

The original medals are believed not to have survived, with only a replica being on display at the Black Watch Museum in Perth, Scotland.

See also
British Army
Capture of Ceylon Medal
Military awards and decorations of Sri Lanka

References

Awards established in 1819
Sri Lankan campaign medals